Elections to Epping Forest Council were held on 7 May 1998.  One third of the council was up for election and the council stayed under no overall control. Overall turnout was 29.4%.

This election marks the last time the Labour Party were the largest party on the council. By 2015, they would have no representation in the council chamber.

Results

Broadway

Buckhurst Hill East

Buckhurst Hill West

Chigwell Row

Chigwell Village

Debden Green

Epping Hemnall

Epping Lindsey

Grange Hill

Loughton Forest

Loughton Roding

Loughton St. John's

Loughton St. Mary's

Nazeing

North Weald Bassett

Theydon Bois

Waltham Abbey East

Waltham Abbey Paternoster

Waltham Abbey West

References
"Council poll results", The Guardian 9 May 1998 page 16
Ward results

1998
1998 English local elections
1990s in Essex